Hatunmarka (Quechua hatun big, marka settlement / storey, "big settlement", hispanicized spelling Hatunmarca, Jatun Malca) is an archaeological site in Peru. It is located in the Junín Region, Jauja Province, Marco District. The site was declared  a National Cultural Heritage by Resolución Directoral Nacional No. 1346 in November 2000.

See also 
 Tunanmarca
 Waqlamarka

References 

Archaeological sites in Peru
Archaeological sites in Junín Region